Untamed is the second album by Heather Myles. Most of its songs were either written or co-written by Myles. It includes such tunes as "Cadillac Cowboy," "Indigo Moon," and a cover of the Marty Robbins tune, "Begging to You."

Track listing
"And It Hurts" (Jack Rymes) – 3:32
"Just Leave Me Alone" (Eddy Raven/Sanger D. Shafer) – 2:34
"When You Walked Out on Me" (Heather Myles) – 3:04
"Cadillac Cowboy" (Heather Myles) – 2:31
"Until I Couldn't Have You" (Heather Myles) – 4:08
"Indigo Moon" (Heather Myles) – 3:07
"It Ain't Over" (Heather Myles) – 2:59
"Begging to You" (Marty Robbins) – 2:48
"How Could She?" (Randi Michaels) – 3:11
"Coming Back to Me" (Heather Myles) – 4:12
"Gone Too Long" (Heather Myles/Dickey Lee) – 3:20
"Untamed" (Heather Myles) – 3:00

Reception

Richie Unterberger of AllMusic believed that while Myles's music was moderate, Unterberger believed Myles did not stand out in Californian country music.

References

Heather Myles albums
1995 albums